Thomas or Tom Tyler may refer to:
Tom Tyler (1903–1954), actor 
Tom R. Tyler (born 1950), professor of psychology and law
Thomas Tyler (scholar) (1826–1902), writer and Shakespeare expert 
Tom Tyler (musician), British singer/songwriter
Thomas Tyler (martyr) in Marian persecutions
Thomas Tyler, character played by Mel Novak
Thomas M. Tyler, Maine State Representative
Detective Inspector Tom Tyler, series of books by Maureen Jennings